Ronald Arthur Howard (born August 27, 1934) is an emeritus professor in the Department of Engineering-Economic Systems (now the Department of Management Science and Engineering) in the School of Engineering at Stanford University.

Howard directs teaching and research in decision analysis at Stanford and is the Director of the Decisions and Ethics Center, which examines the efficacy and ethics of decision-making under uncertainties. He coined the term "Decision Analysis" in a paper in 1966, kickstarting the field. He was a founding Director and Chairman of Strategic Decisions Group. Current research interests are improving the quality of decisions, life-and-death decision-making, and the creation of a coercion-free society. Howard also taught a graduate-level course, "Voluntary Social Systems", which investigated the means of constructing and operating a coercion-free society.

In 1986 he received the Operations Research Society of America's Frank P. Ramsey Medal "for distinguished contributions in decision analysis".  In 1998 he received from the Institute for Operations Research and the Management Sciences (INFORMS) the first award for the teaching of operations research/management science practice. In 1999 INFORMS invited him to give the Omega Rho Distinguished Plenary Lecture at the Cincinnati National Meeting.

Howard was elected a member of the National Academy of Engineering in 1999 for contributions to the foundations of decision analysis and its application. He received the Dean's Award for Academic Excellence. He was elected to the 2002 class of Fellows of the Institute for Operations Research and the Management Sciences. The Raiffa-Howard award for organizational decision quality is named after him and Howard Raiffa.

Howard earned his Sc.D. in Electrical Engineering from MIT in 1958 (under George E. Kimball) and was an associate professor there until he joined Stanford in 1965. He pioneered the policy iteration method for solving Markov decision problems, and this method is sometimes called the "Howard policy-improvement algorithm" in his honor. He was also instrumental in the development of the Influence diagram for the graphical analysis of decision situations.

In 1980 Howard introduced the concept of micromort as a one-in-a-million chance of death.

Publications
 1960. Dynamic Programming and Markov Processes, The M.I.T. Press.  
 1971. Dynamic Probabilistic Systems (two volumes), John Wiley & Sons, Inc., New York City.
 1977. Readings in Decision Analysis. With Jim E. Matheson (editors). SRI International, Menlo Park, California.
 1984. Readings on the Principles and Applications of Decision Analysis. (volume 1, volume 2). With Jim E. Matheson (editors). Menlo Park CA: Strategic Decisions Group.
 2008. Ethics for the Real World. With Clinton D. Korver. Harvard Business Press. 
 2015. "Foundations of Decision Analysis". With Ali Abbas. Pearson.

References

External links
Howard's home page at Stanford University
Howard, Ronald.  Studies in Discrete Dynamic Programming, May 19, 1959 - Doctoral Thesis
 Biography of Ronald A. Howard from the Institute for Operations Research and the Management Sciences

American operations researchers
Stanford University School of Engineering faculty
MIT School of Engineering alumni
Living people
1934 births
Members of the United States National Academy of Engineering
Fellows of the Institute for Operations Research and the Management Sciences